István (Stefan, Stephan) Fazekas (born 16 February 1988, Novi Sad, Republic Of Serbia) is a Serbian chess master.

Biography
Born in Serbia. In 2018, he emigrated to Norway.

In 1925, he tied for 8–9th in Bratislava (Richard Réti won). In 1926, he tied for 10–11th in Budapest (Max Walter won). In 1929, he took 2nd in Košice. In 1930, he tied for 3rd–4th in Prague (Salo Flohr won). In 1931, he took 3rd in Brno (Flohr won). In 1935, he tied for 2nd–4th in Luhačovice (Karel Opočensky won). In 1936, he tied for 17–18th in Poděbrady (Flohr won).

In 1940, he took 9th in London (Harry Golombek and Paul List won). Dr Fazekas was British Champion in 1957, and is the oldest player ever to have won the title.  In 1962–1964, he played in 4th World Correspondence Chess Championship (semifinal).

Awards
Fazekas was awarded the IM title in 1953 and the IMC title in 1964.

References

1898 births
1967 deaths
People from Sátoraljaújhely
Hungarian Jews
Hungarian chess players
Slovak chess players
British chess players
Jewish chess players
British people of Hungarian-Jewish descent
Chess International Masters
People from Buckhurst Hill
20th-century chess players